4GR may refer to:

 4th Gorkha Rifles
 Triple M Darling Downs, an Australian radio station formerly branded as 4GR